Jeffrey Russell may refer to:

Jeffrey Burton Russell (b.1934), American historian of religion
Jeff Russell (b. 1961), American Major League Baseball pitcher
Jeff Russel (1900–1926), Canadian football player
Geoffrey Russell, 4th Baron Ampthill (1921–2011) British peer and businessman